This article contains information about licences to operate pleasure craft. For the international licence also known as ICC, see International Certificate of Competence.

Europe

East Asia 

 Non ICC included 

 ：
 Yacht Driving License
 ：
 Pleasure Vessel Operator Certificate of Competence
 ：
 Pleasure Boat Driver License

References 

Sailing qualifications
Water transport